Wuchang railway station is a major railway station on the Beijing–Guangzhou railway, the Wuhan–Jiujiang railway and the Hankou–Danjiangkou railway, located on the east side of Zhongshan Road in Wuchang District, Wuhan, Hubei, China.

Founded as the Tongxiangmen railway station (通湘门站) in 1916, the station was moved several times and settled in the current location in 1957. It is the largest transportation center in Wuhan with daily traffic of 77,000 passengers and 20,000 packages as of 2000, and a record of 80,000 passengers per day during the Chunyun period as of 2008.

Gallery

Wuhan Metro

Wuchang Railway Station, is a transfer station of Line 4 and Line 7 of the Wuhan Metro. It entered revenue service on December 28, 2013. It is located in Wuchang District and it serves Wuchang railway station.

Station layout

Gallery

Bus
Bus No. 10 and Special Line 561 run between this station and Hankou.

See also
 Wuhan–Guangzhou high-speed railway (which serves Wuhan, rather than Wuchang)

References

External links
 
 Official website

Railway stations in Wuhan
Stations on the Beijing–Guangzhou Railway
Wuhan Metro stations
Line 4, Wuhan Metro
Line 7, Wuhan Metro
Railway stations in China opened in 1916